On Swift Horses is an upcoming drama film directed by  Daniel Minahan, with Bryce Kass adapting the script from the novel by Shannon Pufahl of the same name. Ley Line Entertainment and FirstGen Content produce the project which has an ensemble cast which includes Daisy Edgar-Jones, Jacob Elordi, Will Poulter, Diego Calva and Sasha Calle.

Synopsis
Newlyweds Muriel and Lee are beginning a bright new life after he returns from the Korean War when the arrival of Lee’s charismatic younger brother, Julius, a wayward gambler with a secret, creates a dangerous love triangle. Julius heads for Las Vegas and Muriel embarks on a secret life of gambling on racehorses and discovers a love she thought impossible.

Cast
 Daisy Edgar-Jones as Muriel 
 Jacob Elordi as Julius
 Will Poulter as Lee
 Diego Calva as Henry
 Sasha Calle as Sandra

Production
Producer Peter Spears and director Daniel Minehan started the project in July 2021 with Ley Line Entertainment and Bryce Kass adapting the novel by Shannon Pufahl. Spears is producing alongside Mollye Asher, Tim Headington, Theresa Steele Page, and Michael D’Alto. Finance is coming from Ley Line Entertainment and FirstGen alongside Wavelength. Alvaro Valente and script-writer Bryce Kass are executive producers as are Killer Films’ Christine Vachon and Pamela Koffler, Nate Kamiya and David Darby of Ley Line, Randal Sandler, Claude Amadeo and Chris Triana for FirstGen, and Jennifer Westphal and Joe Plummer for Wavelength.

Filming
Principal photography was confirmed to have started on the production in Los Angeles on February 28, 2023. Diego Calva told Variety that he and Jacob Elordi have some “pretty hot scenes”.

References

External links

Upcoming films
Films shot in California